Calcium-activated potassium channel subunit beta-3 is a protein that in humans is encoded by the KCNMB3 gene.

MaxiK channels are large conductance, voltage and calcium-sensitive potassium channels which are fundamental to the control of smooth muscle tone and neuronal excitability. MaxiK channels can be formed by 2 subunits: the pore-forming alpha subunit and the modulatory beta subunit. The protein encoded by this gene is an auxiliary beta subunit which may partially inactivate or slightly decrease the activation time of MaxiK alpha subunit currents. At least four transcript variants encoding four different isoforms have been found for this gene.

See also
 BK channel
 Voltage-gated potassium channel

References

Further reading

Ion channels